Bobby Curtis was an early twentieth-century Scottish footballer.

Curtis began his career in his native Scotland with Dumfries club, Queen of the South. He moved to the United States where he signed with the Brooklyn Wanderers of the American Soccer League. At Wanderers he played beside another ex Queen of the South player, David Robertson. He spent eight years playing professionally in the United States. This included two spells with Wanderers and four other clubs across four seasons. He scored 68 goals in 234 games in the ASL.

References

External links
 

Scottish footballers
Association football forwards
Queen of the South F.C. players
Brooklyn Wanderers players
Providence Clamdiggers players
J&P Coats players
New York Americans (soccer) (1930–1933) players
New York Nationals (ASL) players
American Soccer League (1921–1933) players
Scottish expatriate footballers
Scottish expatriate sportspeople in the United States
Expatriate soccer players in the United States
Year of birth missing
Year of death missing